The William M. Steger Federal Building and United States Courthouse is a historic government building built in Tyler, Texas. It was built during 1933–1934 in a restrained Classical Revival style. It served historically as a courthouse, post office, and a government office building. The building was listed on the National Register of Historic Places in 2001 as the Tyler US Post Office and Courthouse.

It was designed by local architect Shirley Simons with supervision by the Office of the Supervising Architect under James A. Wetmore.  Its materials include a dark gray mottled granite on the ground floor, light buff limestone cladding the first floor, salmon-colored brick on the second and third floors.  Acroterions appear at each corner of a parapet.

See also

National Register of Historic Places listings in Smith County, Texas

References

External links

Courthouses on the National Register of Historic Places in Texas
Neoclassical architecture in Texas
Government buildings completed in 1934
Buildings and structures in Tyler, Texas
Post office buildings on the National Register of Historic Places in Texas
Courthouses in Texas
National Register of Historic Places in Smith County, Texas
1934 establishments in Texas